Miss India Worldwide 2013 was the 22nd edition of the international beauty pageant. The final was held in Kuala Lumpur, Malaysia on  April 28, 2013. About 39 countries were represented in the pageant. Nehal Bhogaita of the United Kingdom was crowned as winner at the end of the event. Nehal was the first deaf contestant and first deaf winner in the pageant's history.

Results

Special awards

Delegates

 – Karishma Manwani
 – Zenia Starr Miss India Australia 2013
 – Arpita Khaur
 – Janine Gilharry
 – Rupal Lakhani
 – Sheryl Kumar
 – Joelle Joseph
 – Shivani Sandher
 – Kershnee Pillay
 – Cindy Patrix
 – Katherina Roshana
 – Preeti Soni
 – Shreenjit Kaur
 – Selma Gabbarini
 – Bhavini Sheth
 – Manisha Singh
 – Jasveer Kaur Sandhu
 – Jannita Deerpaul
 – Madleen Appaoo
 – Gareema Pandey
 – Astrid Narain
 – Anamika Singh
 – Ayushi Chhabra
 – Nisha Haroon
 – Surbhi Sachdev
 – Alysha Suri
 – Carole Ravoula
 – Dolly Mirpuri
 – Aavishka Ragam
 – Koschika Singh
 – Gayathri Kesavan
 – Rukshani Ranathunga
 – Jeanine Jaikaran
 – Ritika Sood
 – Shridevi Bissoondial
 – Savi Chaplot
 – Geentanjali Kelath
 – Nehal Bhogaita
 – Priyam Bhargava

Crossovers
Contestants who previously competed or will compete at other beauty pageants:
Miss Universe
2013: :  Katherina Roshana

References

External links
Home

2013 beauty pageants